Foveacheles is a genus of mites belonging to the family Rhagidiidae.

The genus has cosmopolitan distribution.

Species:

Foveacheles alpina 
Foveacheles arenaria 
Foveacheles brevichelae 
Foveacheles canestrinii 
Foveacheles cannadasi 
Foveacheles causasica 
Foveacheles cegetensis 
Foveacheles clavicrinita 
Foveacheles gigantea 
Foveacheles halltalensis 
Foveacheles halophila 
Foveacheles harzensis 
Foveacheles magna 
Foveacheles mira 
Foveacheles osloensis 
Foveacheles paralleloseta 
Foveacheles proxima 
Foveacheles rupestris 
Foveacheles simulata 
Foveacheles terricola 
Foveacheles troglodyta 
Foveacheles unguiculata 
Foveacheles willmanni

References

Trombidiformes